The 2016 Vietnam Open was a professional tennis tournament played on hard courts. It is the second edition of the tournament which is part of the 2016 ATP Challenger Tour. It took place in Ho Chi Minh City, Vietnam between 10 and 16 October 2016.

Singles main-draw entrants

Seeds

 1 Rankings are as of 3 October 2016.

Other entrants
The following players received wildcards into the singles main draw:
  Lý Hoàng Nam
  Christopher Rungkat
  Maxime Tabatruong
  Nguyễn Hoàng Thiên

The following players received entry from the qualifying draw:
  Vijay Sundar Prashanth
  Laurent Rochette 
  Shuichi Sekiguchi 
  Sanam Singh

Champions

Singles

  Jordan Thompson def.  Go Soeda, 5–7, 7–5, 6–1.

Doubles

  Sanchai Ratiwatana /  Sonchat Ratiwatana def.  Jeevan Nedunchezhiyan /  Ramkumar Ramanathan, 7–5, 6–4.

Vietnam Open (tennis)
Vietnam Open (tennis)